During the French Revolution (1789–1799 or 1815), a représentant en mission (English: representative on mission) was an extraordinary envoy of the Legislative Assembly. The term is most often assigned to deputies designated by the National Convention for maintaining law and order in the départements and armies. They had powers to oversee conscription into the army and to monitor both local military command and local compliance with Revolutionary agendas.

Such inspectors had existed in some form under the Ancien Régime, but the position was systematized during the Reign of Terror and the representatives were given absolute power. Some of them abused their powers and exercised a veritable dictatorship at a local level.

Alphabetical list of names

Alphabetical list of names A–B

Alphabetical list of names C–F

Alphabetical list of names G–L

Alphabetical list of names M–Z

Notes, citations, and sources

Notes

Citations